Saddle Mountain Wilderness is a protected wilderness area managed by the Kaibab National Forest north of Grand Canyon National Park in the U.S. state of Arizona.  Established in 1984 under the Arizona Wilderness Act, the area on the Kaibab Plateau includes its namesake summit, a prominent ridge shaped like a saddle that reaches an elevation of 8,424 feet (2,568 m). Elevations in the northern part of the wilderness on the edge of Marble Canyon start at about 6,000 feet and rise to 8,000 on the southern ridge which forms the Nankoweap Rim of the Grand Canyon.

Wildlife abounds as pinyon pine and Utah juniper support populations of mule deer in the lower elevations during the winter.  The same deer migrate to the conifer-laden higher elevations in the summer.  Among other mammals, a herd of bison still roams the area that was introduced in the early 20th century.

See also
 List of Arizona Wilderness Areas
 List of U.S. Wilderness Areas
 Saddle Mountain (Grand Canyon)

References

External links
 Kaibab Plateau Visitor Center – Kaibab National Forest

IUCN Category Ib
Wilderness areas of Arizona
Kaibab National Forest
Protected areas of Coconino County, Arizona
Protected areas established in 1984
1984 establishments in Arizona